= Aint–Bad =

- Editor: Lisa J. Young, Dana Stirling, Fred Hirschman and Audrey Molloy
- Categories: new photographic art
- Frequency: quarterly
- Publisher: Aint-Bad Magazine, Inc.
- Founder: Carson Sanders, Taylor Curry, Caroline McElhinny, Caitie Moore and James Jackman
- Founded: March 2011
- Country: United States
- Based in: Savannah, Georgia
- Website: aint-bad.com
- OCLC: 890798083

Aint–Bad, founded in Savannah, Georgia in 2011, was a contemporary photography publisher that produces a quarterly periodical, among other print media and online content. The publication came under criticism after publishing an issue on photography in the American south while noticeably not including any photographers of color. As of March 2023, the official website hasn't posted any new articles.
